Calcium/calmodulin-dependent 3',5'-cyclic nucleotide phosphodiesterase 1B is an enzyme that in humans is encoded by the PDE1B gene.

References

Further reading